An Bình is a ward of Dĩ An city in Bình Dương Province of Southeast region of Vietnam.

References

Populated places in Bình Dương province